Middletown High School (MHS) is a public high school located in Middletown, Connecticut, United States. It is a part of Middletown Public Schools.

Athletics
Athletic activities include football, volleyball, cross country, crew, swimming and diving, cheerleading, soccer, basketball, wrestling, baseball, softball, track, tennis, golf, and ultimate Frisbee.

References

External links
 

Public high schools in Connecticut
Buildings and structures in Middletown, Connecticut
Middletown, Connecticut
Educational institutions established in 1840
1840 establishments in Connecticut